Mount Kuk ( or Monte Cucco di Plava) is  mountain in Slovenia, near the border with Italy. It is located northeast of Gorizia, near the village of Plave and on the southern edge of the Banjšice Plateau, and along with nearby  and  it forms a mountain ridge along the course of the Isonzo. It was heavily contested by Italian and Austro-Hungarian troops during the battles of the Isonzo in World War I, and was located in Italy from 1918 to 1943.

References

Mountains of the Slovene Littoral
Mountains under 1000 metres
Karst
Mountains of the Alps
Military history of Italy during World War I

it:Monte Cucco di Plava